Castellar Guidobono is a comune (municipality) in the Province of Alessandria in the Italian region Piedmont, located about  east of Turin and about  east of Alessandria.

Castellar Guidobono borders the following municipalities: Casalnoceto, Viguzzolo, and Volpeglino.

History 
Linked to the municipality of Tortona, whose destiny it followed, it was a fief of the Guidobono Cavalchini family of Monleale, from which it derives its name.

References

Cities and towns in Piedmont